Harrison Arms (died 1917) was a Toledo, Ohio livery and stable operator who, in 1885, formed the Arms Palace Horse Car Company for the purpose of transporting racehorses and other high-value animals by rail in a specialized type of "horse car" of his own design.

References

1917 deaths
19th-century American businesspeople
American people in rail transportation